Joel Nkaya Bendera was a Tanzanian politician who was Member of Parliament for the Morogoro Region, in the National Assembly of Tanzania. He worked as the deputy Minister of Information, Culture and Sports since 2006.

Jole Bendera was a former football player and also a former trainer. He was the coach of Tanzania during more than 10 years. He was the coach who clinch the only qualification of Tanzania for the African Nations Cup: "Nigeria 1980".

As Morogoro Regional Commissioner, Mr Bendera worked on numerous initiatives to improve various farming sectors in the region. In 2013 he worked with tobacco companies, and praised them for being 'job creators' in the local area, and the next year he attempted to push initiatives to allow farmers better access to weather reporting systems as a measure to reduce disasters cause by flooding and climate change. In the same vein, he called for pastoralists to be forcibly evicted from the region after an order to voluntarily relocate was ignored. He cited conflicts with local farmers and environmental issues caused by illegal grazing as the main cause of the evictions.

References

External links
 Member of Parliament CV

Members of the National Assembly (Tanzania)
Chama Cha Mapinduzi MPs
Tanzanian footballers
Tanzanian football managers
1950 births
2017 deaths
Association footballers not categorized by position